In differential geometry, Cohn-Vossen's inequality, named after Stefan Cohn-Vossen, relates the integral of Gaussian curvature of a non-compact surface to the Euler characteristic.  It is akin to the Gauss–Bonnet theorem for a compact surface.

A divergent path within a Riemannian manifold is a smooth curve in the manifold that is not contained within any compact subset of the manifold.  A complete manifold is one in which every divergent path has infinite length with respect to the Riemannian metric on the manifold.  Cohn-Vossen's inequality states that in every complete Riemannian 2-manifold S with finite total curvature and finite Euler characteristic, we have

 

where K is the Gaussian curvature, dA is the element of area, and χ is the Euler characteristic.

Examples
 If S is a compact surface (without boundary), then the inequality is an equality by the usual Gauss–Bonnet theorem for compact manifolds.
 If S has a boundary, then the Gauss–Bonnet theorem gives

where  is the geodesic curvature of the boundary, and its integral the total curvature which is necessarily positive for a boundary curve, and the inequality is strict.  (A similar result holds when the boundary of S is piecewise smooth.)
 If S is the plane R2, then the curvature of S is zero, and χ(S) = 1, so the inequality is strict: 0 < 2.

Notes and references

External links 
 Gauss–Bonnet theorem, in the Encyclopedia of Mathematics, including a brief account of Cohn-Vossen's inequality

Theorems in differential geometry
Inequalities